Club Monaco is a Canadian-founded low-end luxury casual clothing retailer owned by Regent, L.P. With more than 140 locations worldwide, the retailer has locations in the United States, Canada, Hong Kong, Macao, Taiwan, South Korea, China, the United Arab Emirates, Malaysia, Indonesia, Singapore, Saudi Arabia, Sweden, Turkey, and United Kingdom.

Each month, Club Monaco brings in a new collection, alternating between elevated casual styles during the northern spring and summer and more formal offerings during autumn and winter. Originally, the company was best known for its classic "black and white" styles, with which different colors are paired, but this is no longer a focus in each collection.

History
Club Monaco was founded in 1985 by Canadians Joe Mimran, Saul Mimran, and Alfred Sung powered by the idea of “better basics”—clear, confident pieces that punch above their weight and deliver on the details. Inspired by a great “great new ideas”, the first Club Monaco store opened in Toronto on Queen Street West in 1985. The approach was simple and clean, mirroring the sensibility of the clothing and featuring a cafe that acted as a place of discovery and community. As the brand grew, new locations continued to open throughout Canada, each retaining its own feel—the Beach store in Toronto featured a lifeguard station display and a small juice bar, while the Eaton Centre store featured a restaurant and flower shop. Each store was a unique expression of the brand with all of the accoutrements.

In 1999, Club Monaco moved to New York City when it was purchased by Ralph Lauren Corporation and continues to operate independently within the group. Since then, Club Monaco has expanded, opening locations throughout the United States, Europe, and Asia.

In May 2021, Ralph Lauren Corporation announced it would sell its Club Monaco brand to private equity firm Regent LP.

Caban
Caban was a design-oriented furniture, tabletop, home accessories, bed and bath and apparel retailer launched by Club Monaco as its lifestyle brand in October 2000 in Toronto, Montreal, and Vancouver, with locations opening later in Calgary and Edmonton.

Caban was an offspring of Club Monaco and Joe Mimran, who was the founder of Club Monaco. In 2000, just after the launch, Club Monaco/Caban was purchased by Ralph Lauren Corporation. It began to lose focus, and Mimran was ousted. In the summer of 2006, Ralph Lauren Corporation closed all of the Caban stores to focus on Club Monaco in the United States. The last store to close was the flagship store on Queen St. West in Toronto.

Caban had opened its first lifestyle concept store in Montreal in the historical landmark Laurentian Bank building (located at 777 St. Catherine Street, on the corner of McGill College) on Saturday, December 9, 2000. It closed the branch in 2006, after which Banana Republic opened its flagship Quebec store there.

References

External links

 

Clothing brands of the United States
Clothing retailers of the United States
Companies based in New York City
Shops in New York City